Vălcineț may refer to several places in Moldova:

Vălcineț, Călărași, a commune in Călărași District
Vălcineț, Ocnița, a commune in Ocnița District